Inglewood is a town in the Taranaki Region of New Zealand's North Island. The town services a mainly dairy farming region.

History

The settlement was founded in 1873 and was originally called Moatown. The name was then changed to Milton, before ultimately being renamed to Inglewood in 1875 to avoid confusion with Milton in the South Island.

The railway reached Inglewood in 1877, connecting it with New Plymouth as part of the first extension of what is now the Marton–New Plymouth line.

Until 1991, Inglewood was home to the Moa-Nui Co-operative Dairies factory (which was the fourth largest dairy factory in New Zealand) before it was shut down in favour of centralised processing near Hāwera.

From 1949 until the late 1980s, Inglewood was home to Fun Ho! Toys, a manufacturer of collectible die cast metal toys and one of New Zealand's largest toy companies. The factory shut down in 1987 but a museum in the town still exists with over 3000 toys on display.

Despite its small population, the town has gained notoriety from a string of violent crimes which tend toward the gruesome, bizarre and barbaric. A 2015 book by the anthropologist Michael D. Jackson refers to "Inglewood’s violent past" and "the popular claim that Inglewood is the 'murder capital' and 'psychopathic centre' of New Zealand".

A number of buildings are listed by Heritage New Zealand. The Railway Station and Yard is listed as Category I. The Shoe Store Building on the corner of Rata and Richmond Streets is one of eight listed as Category II.

Marae

Te Kōhanga Moa Marae is located in Inglewood. It features the Matamua meeting house, and is affiliated with the Te Āti Awa hapū of Pukerangiora.

In October 2020, the Government committed $817,845 from the Provincial Growth Fund to upgrade it and Muru Raupatu marae, creating 15 jobs.

Demographics

Inglewood had a population of 3,543 at the 2018 New Zealand census, an increase of 300 people (9.3%) since the 2013 census, and an increase of 456 people (14.8%) since the 2006 census. There were 1,404 households, comprising 1,707 males and 1,836 females, giving a sex ratio of 0.93 males per female. The median age was 38.4 years (compared with 37.4 years nationally), with 741 people (20.9%) aged under 15 years, 654 (18.5%) aged 15 to 29, 1,503 (42.4%) aged 30 to 64, and 648 (18.3%) aged 65 or older.

Ethnicities were 91.1% European/Pākehā, 14.4% Māori, 2.3% Pacific peoples, 2.5% Asian, and 1.6% other ethnicities. People may identify with more than one ethnicity.

The percentage of people born overseas was 11.6, compared with 27.1% nationally.

Although some people chose not to answer the census's question about religious affiliation, 55.9% had no religion, 33.3% were Christian, 0.3% had Māori religious beliefs, 0.4% were Hindu, 0.1% were Muslim, 0.1% were Buddhist and 1.4% had other religions.

Of those at least 15 years old, 312 (11.1%) people had a bachelor's or higher degree, and 738 (26.3%) people had no formal qualifications. The median income was $29,300, compared with $31,800 nationally. 339 people (12.1%) earned over $70,000 compared to 17.2% nationally. The employment status of those at least 15 was that 1,371 (48.9%) people were employed full-time, 414 (14.8%) were part-time, and 96 (3.4%) were unemployed.

Education

Inglewood has a number of coeducational schools.

The school was established in 1957.

Inglewood Primary School was founded in 1875. St Patrick's is a state integrated Catholic school.

Rolls are as of

Notable people
Inglewood has produced four All Blacks (John Major, Handley Brown, Dave "Trapper" Loveridge, Chris Masoe), and a leading contemporary artist, Michael Stevenson, who represented New Zealand at the 2003 Venice Biennale.

Other notable people include:
 Fleur Beale (born 1945), fiction writer
 Henry Brown (1842–1921), sawmiller and Member of the House of Representatives (1896–1899)
 Fiona Clark (born 1954), photographer
 Harry Kerr (1879–1951), athlete
 Margaret Sparrow (born 1935), medical doctor and reproductive rights activist
 Ben Hana a.k.a. Blanket Man (1957–2012), Wellington identity, famous for wearing only a blanket
 Bill Sullivan (1891–1967), politician

References

Further reading

General historical works

Arts and literature

Business history

Churches

Anglican

Catholic

Methodist

Clubs and organisations

Environment

Maps

NOTE:  Scale = 1: 12 500

NOTE:  Scale = 1: 15 000

NOTE:  Scale = 1: 15 000

People

Schools

External links 
 Inglewood - Community Website.
 Inglewood High School website
 Fun Ho! Toy Museum and Factory

Populated places in Taranaki
New Plymouth District